Simon Gosejohann (born 9 January 1976) is a German comedian, television presenter and actor.

In 2008, Gosejohann won the "Deutscher Comedypreis" (German Comedy Award) in the category "Best Comedy Show" for his role in Elton vs. Simon. A year later, he received the "Best Hidden Camera Award" for his show Comedystreet.

References

External links 

 Gosejohann's official website 
 

1976 births
Living people
People from Gütersloh
German male television actors
German male comedians
German television personalities
German television presenters
ProSieben people